Sopanen is a Finnish surname. Notable people with the surname include:

 Elias Sopanen (1863–1926), Finnish judge, farmer and politician
 Vili Sopanen (born 1987), Finnish professional ice hockey player
 Iiro Sopanen (born 1989), Finnish professional ice hockey forward
 Eetu Sopanen (born 1996), Finnish ice hockey defenceman
 Teija Sopanen, Finnish beauty queen

Finnish-language surnames